Combe Haven is a  biological Site of Special Scientific Interest between Hastings and Bexhill-on-Sea in East Sussex.

This site has diverse habitats. Most of it is poorly drained alluvial meadows which are divided by drainage ditches. There is also ancient woodland and Filsham Reedbed is the largest area of reed beds in East Sussex. There are diverse breeding and wintering birds and many species of butterflies.

References

Sites of Special Scientific Interest in East Sussex
Bexhill-on-Sea